Overclocked is the first widely available studio album by American blues rock musician and computer scientist Jim Allchin. It was released on September 13, 2011 by Sandy Key Music. The title of the album and first track is a reference to overclocking – deliberately increasing the clock speed of a CPU past the rated amount – resulting in a faster system while generating increased heat often requiring additional cooling.

Reception

Overclocked received widespread positive comments and ratings by reviewers.

Track listing

Personnel

Musicians
Jim Allchin – guitar, vocals, arrangements
Chris Leighton and Ben Smith – drums, percussion
Garey Shelton – bass
Ty Ballie and David Gross – keyboard

Guest musicians
Keely Whitney – vocals on "One for the Money" and "Perfect Game"
Martin Ros, Mycle Wastman, Keely Whitney – background vocals
Colin Pulkrabek – trombone
Josh Gailey – trumpet
Scott Macpherson – tenor sax
New York Brass - horns

Additional personnel
Glenn Lorbecki – production assistance,  engineering, mixing
Eric Oz – production assistance, engineering, mixing
James Nixon – engineering
Glenn Lorbecki – rhythm guitar
Ed Brooks - mastering, RFI, Seattle
Susan Doupe – photography

References

2011 albums
Jim Allchin albums